Hotlines is an American reality television series about adventures in exotic, fun hotspots. The series was hosted by Deirdre Delaney, Scott Gurney, Ivana Bozilovic and Stacy Kamano, the first two of whom were also its producers. In each episode, the hosts would be shown engaging in various outdoor activities such as scuba diving, sky diving and jungle walks. Intercut with the footage, two or more of the female hosts would occasionally talk to the camera, explaining how exciting, scary or fun a particular situation had been. Hotlines was originally shown on Spike TV from 2003 to 2004.

External links
 

American travel television series
2003 American television series debuts
2004 American television series endings